Belizeana is a genus of fungi in the class Dothideomycetes. The relationship of this taxon to other taxa within the class is unknown (incertae sedis). This is a monotypic genus, consisting of the single species Belizeana tuberculata.

See also 
 List of Dothideomycetes genera incertae sedis

References

External links 
Index Fungorum

Dothideomycetes enigmatic taxa
Monotypic Dothideomycetes genera